David or Dave Ellis may refer to:

Arts and entertainment
 David Ellis (scriptwriter) (1918–1978), British television series writer
 David Ellis (biographer), (1939– ), writer of biographies of English authors
 David R. Ellis (1952–2013), film director, former actor and stunt man
 Dave Ellis (game designer) (born 1965), computer game designer and author
 Dave Ellis (saxophonist), jazz saxophonist

Sports
 Dave Ellis (footballer) (1869–1940), Scottish international footballer
 David Ellis (Scottish footballer) (1900–?), Scottish footballer
 David Ellis (Australian footballer) (born 1949), Australian rules footballer
 David Ellis (Australian cricketer) (born 1951), Australian cricketer
 David Ellis (English cricketer) (born 1934), former English cricketer
 Dave Ellis (runner) (born 1937), Canadian Olympic athlete
 David Ellis (swimmer), British swimmer

Other
 David Ellis (architect) (born 1953), Canadian architect
 David Ellis (botanist) (1874–1937), British botanist, bacteriologist and baker
 David Ellis (consultant), president of Lafayette College
 David Ellis (priest) (1736–1795), Welsh priest and poet
 Dave Ellis, trade unionist and Respect – The Unity Coalition candidate